Ruza Kuzieva (born 12 March 1994) is an Uzbekistani Paralympic powerlifter. She won the silver medal in the women's 61 kg event at the 2020 Summer Paralympics held in Tokyo, Japan. She won the gold medal in the women's 55 kg event at the 2018 Asian Para Games and she is a two-time medalist at the World Para Powerlifting Championships.

Career

In 2013, she was banned for two years after testing positive for metandienone, a banned substance. A few years later, in 2016, she tested positive for meldonium but she was not banned at that time.

She won the bronze medal in the women's 55 kg event at the 2017 World Para Powerlifting Championships held in Mexico City, Mexico. At the 2019 World Para Powerlifting Championships held in Nur-Sultan, Kazakhstan, she won the silver medal in the women's 61 kg event.

Results

References

External links
 

Living people
1994 births
Place of birth missing (living people)
Female powerlifters
Paralympic powerlifters of Uzbekistan
Powerlifters at the 2020 Summer Paralympics
Uzbekistani powerlifters
Medalists at the 2020 Summer Paralympics
Paralympic silver medalists for Uzbekistan
Paralympic medalists in powerlifting
Uzbekistani sportspeople in doping cases
Doping cases in weightlifting
21st-century Uzbekistani women